The 2020 MBC Drama Awards, presented by Munhwa Broadcasting Corporation (MBC). It was hosted by Kim Sung-joo. It aired on December 30, 2020 at 21:00 (KST).

Winners and nominees
Winners denoted in bold

See also
 2020 KBS Drama Awards
 2020 SBS Drama Awards
 7th APAN Star Awards

References

External links
 

2020 television awards
MBC Drama Awards
2020 in South Korean television
2020 in South Korea
MBC TV original programming